Jerome Theisen (30 December 1930 – 11 September 1995) was an American Benedictine monk of Saint John's Abbey, Collegeville, the eighth abbot of Saint John's Abbey, Collegeville, and the seventh Abbot Primate of the Order of St. Benedict and the Benedictine Confederation.

Biography
Jerome Theisen was born in Loyal, Wisconsin, United States, on 30 December 1930, the ninth of ten children (five boys and five girls). His parents were William and Mae (née Reif) Theisen. He came to Saint John's to initially study Latin in preparation for seminary, but was drawn to the monastic life and entered the abbey making his religious profession on 11 July 1952. He completed his undergraduate degree in Philosophy and was ordained as a Roman Catholic priest on 28 July 1957. He completed his doctoral studies in Rome at the Pontificio Ateneo Sant'Anselmo in 1966 with his dissertation  entitled "Mass Liturgy and the Council of Trent." Theisen returned to America and began an extensive scholarly life writing books and articles, along with giving retreats, workshops, lectures, and serving as a professor at numerous academic institutions. As noted in his obituary: 

On 22 August 1979 Theisen was elected as the eighth abbot of Saint John's Abbey receiving his abbatial blessing on 19 October 1979. He served in the role for the next thirteen years until he was elected as the seventh Abbot Primate of the Benedictine Confederation and Order of St. Benedict on 19 September 1992. As Abbot Primate he resided in Rome, Italy, overseeing Sant'Anselmo all'Aventino.
 
During his abbatial years at Saint John's and later as Abbot Primate for a short three years before his death, he travelled quite extensively to represent the Benedictine community. As his home abbey of Saint John's had to address the growing realization of prior sexual abuse by monks of their monastery, Theisen would establish in 1991 the "Interfaith Sexual Trauma Institute." As Abbot Primate he would be remembered especially for his role in convoking in Rome an international gathering of women monastics in September 1992. After only three years into his six-year term as Abbot Primate, Theisen died of a heart attack on 11 September 1995 and is buried at Saint John's Abbey in Collegeville, Minnesota.

References

External links
 Saint John's Abbey (in English)
 The Benedictine Confederation of Congregations of Monasteries of the Order of Saint Benedict (in Italian and English)
 International Atlas of Benedictine Monasteries (in English)
 Pontificio Ateneo Sant'Anselmo (in Italian and English)
 Collegio Sant'Anselmo (in Italian and English)

1930 births
1995 deaths
20th-century American Roman Catholic theologians
20th-century American Roman Catholic priests
American Benedictines
Abbots Primate
Benedictine scholars
Benedictine writers
20th-century Christian monks
College of Saint Benedict and Saint John's University alumni
Pontifical Atheneum of St. Anselm alumni
20th-century American male writers
American male non-fiction writers
20th-century American non-fiction writers
Benedictine abbots